The Mabi/Yaya Classified Forest is found in Ivory Coast, and it covers . The village Kossandji is partially surrounded by the forest, and the town of Annépé is close to its western edge.

It is classified in IV IUCN category.

It is one of the last habitats of the forest toad Sclerophrys togoensis.

References

External links
 APES MAPPER

Protected areas of Ivory Coast
Forests of Ivory Coast